Shamwari is a film that starred two of South Africa's leading actors, Ken Gampu and Ian Yule. It is about two escapees that can't stand each other. Chained together they embark on an escape from custody.

Background
The film was shot on location in and around the city of Salisbury. It was released in the United States on both Beta and VHS through Media Home Entertainment. Ken Gampu played the part of Khumalo, Ian Yule played the part of Mathews and Tamara Franke played the part of Tracy. Dominic Kanaventi also appears the film in one of his early roles, and  also in an early role, John Indi makes an appearance as the witchdoctor. Ian Yule was also the co-writer for the film. He was led to believe that the film was a flop. John Hume who produced the film was marketing it under a different name. The soundtrack for the movie was provided by the music group Four Jacks and a Jill.

The film was released in South Africa by Ster-Kinekor and premiered in Johannesburg.

Story
Set during Rhodesia's war years of the 1970s, the story is about two men who are bonded together by chains. The film bears a similarity to an earlier film, The Defiant Ones that starred Sidney Poitier and Tony Curtis. Like the characters in The Defiant Ones, there is racial hatred between the two of them. The two main characters who have escaped from a harsh chain gang. To survive they have to bury their hatred as they try to make their way to freedom as they cross the country.

Releases
Beta VCL VL9037 - United States - 1985.

Cast

 Ian Yule   ...  Bill Matthews 
 Ken Gampu   ...  Khumalo 
 Tamara Franke   ...  Tracy 
 Denny Fathe-Aazam   ... Inspector Spencer 
 Joshua Makawa  ...  Fanyana 
 Oliver Tengende   ...  Sipho 
 Jon Allen   ... The Seducer 
 Jimmy Coburn   ... Jack, Tracy's Boyfriend 
 Ron Tornbohn   ... Storekeeper 
 Sam Matambo   ... Gardener 
 John Indi   ...  Witchdoctor 
 Jane Kilalea   ... Policewoman 
 Debbie Brinkworth   ...  Nurse 
 Vic Crous   ...  First Warder 
 Dennis Hardman   ...  Second Warder 
 Stanley Gorodema   ...  Police Sergeant 
 Alan Cockle   ...  Reporter 
 Cecil Holmes   ...  Pilot 
 Garry Watson   ...  Slide Projectionist 
 Steve Chigorimbo   ...  Sipho's Man #1 
 Brian Dzimwasha   ...  Sipho's Man #2 
 Ephrim Mhute   ...  Sipho's Man #3 
 Alan Gibson   ...  Farmer

 Clive Bulle   ...  Farmer 
 Rita Chiwedzwa   ...  Khumalo's Wife 
 Judy Turner   ...  Matthews' Wife 
 Hilton Mambo   ...  Lone Terrorist 
 Blackie Swarts   ...  Engine Driver 
 Mike Wakefield   ...  Fireman (Stoker) 
 Barry McCurdy   ...  Guard Force Member 
 Martin Rusike   ...  Guard Force Member  
 Dominic Kanaventi   ...  Guard Force Member 
 Hywell Williams   ...  Policeman 
 Mike Lanchester   ...  Policeman 
 John Lant   ...  Policeman 
 James Thrush   ...  Policeman 
 Eve Chindiwo   ...  Fanyana's Girlfriend 
 Joan Hulley   ...  Lady in Flat 
 Ron Temlett   ...  Barman 
 Clive Harding   ...  Musician / Himself (4 Jacks and a Jill band member) 
 Tony Hughes   ...  Musician / Himself (4 Jacks and a Jill band member) 
 Glenys Lynne   ...  Singer / Herself (4 Jacks and a Jill band member) 
 Paul Nissen   ...  Musician / Himself (4 Jacks and a band member) 
 Neill Pienaar   ... Musician / Himself (4 Jacks and a band member)

References

External links
 

1982 films
Films set in Rhodesia
Rhodesian Bush War films
1980s English-language films